Ravenna Football Club is an Italian association football club, based in Ravenna, Emilia-Romagna. It currently plays in Serie C after achieving promotion as Group D champions in the 2016-17 Serie D season.

The club was founded in 1913.

History

Foundation 
The club was founded in 1913 as football section of sports club Unione Sportiva Ravennate. In 1920, the club merged with Audace Football Club, which was founded only one year earlier, in 1919. The same year the club joined the Italian Football Federation, being part of the Promozione league. Another merger in 1921 with S.G. Forti per essere Liberi brought the club to change its denomination to Unione Sportiva Ravennate Forti per essere Liberi. The main sports club disbanded in 1928, with all its sports sections become separate entities; notably, the football one assuming the denomination of Associazione Calcio Ravenna.

U.S. Ravenna 
In 1936 Ravenna made their first appearance in the Serie C, where they played until 1948. In 1949 the club, now playing in the amateur Interregionale league, became known as Unione Sportiva Ravenna, then switching this denomination to Sarom Unione Sportiva Ravenna for sponsorship reasons in 1954, maintaining it for ten years. Ravenna returned to Serie C in 1950 for a single season, and again in 1955, playing in this division until 1971, when they relegated to Serie D. Another Serie C spell from 1972 to 1976 was followed by two consecutive relegations. Two promotions in a row from 1980 to 1982 then brought the club back to the pro leagues, in the recently created Serie C2. Ravenna relegated to Serie D in 1984, but promptly returned to Serie C2.

In 1992, Ravenna were awarded Serie C2 champions, being promoted to Serie C1. Only one year later, in 1993, Ravenna won the Serie C1 league and gained promotion to Serie B for a historical first time. However, this lasted only one season, and Ravenna returned to Serie C1 in 1994. They returned to Serie B in 1996, playing in the Italian second division until 2001, when they were relegated to Serie C1 and successively cancelled by the Federation because of financial troubles.

Ravenna Calcio 

A new club, Ravenna Calcio, was admitted to play Eccellenza Emilia-Romagna and obtained two consecutive promotions that brought them back to Serie C2 in 2003.

In 2005, Ravenna were promoted to Serie C1 after playoffs, and on 9 May 2007 Ravenna won the 2006–07 Serie C1/B in advance of one matchday, following a 0–0 away tie against Teramo, being thus promoted to Serie B, after six seasons from their last appearance in the second-highest division of Italy. They were relegated in 2008 after a poor Serie B campaign to Lega Pro Prima Divisione. In their first season back in Serie C1, now rebranded as Lega Pro Prima Divisione, Ravenna was coached by debutant manager Gianluca Atzori and missed immediate promotion by losing the playoff semifinals to Padova, who later went on to win the playoff finals as well.

For the 2009–10 season, Ravenna were forced to search for a new head coach after Atzori left for Serie A club Catania, and former Inter Primavera coach Vincenzo Esposito was appointed as a replacement. However, the season started with a huge off-the-field shock, as young Albanian midfielder Brian Filipi, a regular for the team despite his 20 years of age, was hit by a car and left dead on 19 September 2009.

On 18 July 2011 it was excluded by the Federal Council from Lega Pro Prima Divisione, but on 12 August 2011 it was admitted in Serie D/D. after conciliation with FIGC.

2012: Bankruptcy after Relegation 
In the season 2011–12 it was relegated to Eccellenza.

On 29 June 2012 Ravenna Calcio in strong financial difficulty was declared bankrupt by the court of Ravenna.

From S.C. Ravenna Sport 2019 to Ravenna Football Club 
A new club, Ravenna Sport 2019  was admitted to play Promozione Emilia- Romagna and was promoted to Eccellenza Emilia-Romagna.

In summer 2013 the club was renamed with the current name.

Colors and badge 
The team's colors are red and yellow.

Current squad

Notable former players

Notable former managers
 Luigi Delneri
 Francesco Guidolin
 Walter Novellino
 Gyula Zsengellér
 Albert Meyong

Achievements
Serie C1
Winners (3): 1992–93, 1995–96, 2006–07
Super Coppa di Lega Serie C1
Runners-up (1): 2006–07
Serie C2
Winners (1): 1991–92
Runners-up (1): 2004–05
Serie D
Winners (6): 1950–51, 1956–57, 1971–72, 1981–82, 1984–85, 2002–03
Runners-up (1): 1955–56
Scudetto Dilettanti
Winners (1): 1956–57
Eccellenza Emilia-Romagna
Winners (1): 2001–02
Promozione Emilia-Romagna
Winners (4): 1954–55, 1996–97, 1980–81, 2012–13
Runners-up (3): 1920–21, 1978–79, 1979–80
Serie C
Winners (1): 1939–40
Runners-up (2): 1937–38, 1938–39
Seconda Divisione
Winners (1): 1929–30
Terza Divisione Emilia-Romagna
Winners (1): 1927–28

References

External links
Official site

 
Football clubs in Italy
Football clubs in Emilia-Romagna
Association football clubs established in 1913
Serie B clubs
Serie C clubs
1913 establishments in Italy